Edmond Wadih Naim (1918 - January 23, 2006) was a Lebanese politician, jurist and governor of the Banque du Liban.

Biography

Early life and education 
Edmond Naïm was born to a Maronite Catholic family in the town of Chiyah in the Greater Beirut region in the year 1918. He studied at the Jesuit Fathers' School and had a bachelor's degree in Law from the French Law School in Beirut. In 1941 and received a PhD in Law from Saint Joseph University in Beirut.

Career 
Naim was a member of the Progressive Socialist Party between 1951 and 1963. He participated in the parliamentary elections in 1957 and 1960 but without success.

He held the position of Dean of the Faculty of Law of the Lebanese University in 1961 and was then President of the University in 1970 until 1976. In January 1985, he was elected Governor of Lebanon's Central bank, Banque du Liban.

During the Lebanese civil war, he was hailed as hero after he barricaded himself in his office while receiving constant death threats after refusing to lend corrupt government officials any money.

In 1994, Naim became Samir Geagea's, head of the Lebanese Forces militia, lawyer as he was tried and accused of war crimes during the Lebanese Civil war.

In 2005, he was elected as deputy of the Lebanese parliament and was the eldest member of the 2005 legislative cycle as a representative of the Lebanese Forces.

Death 
Edmond Naïm died on January 23, 2006, at the age of 88 from an illness. Naim's seat was replaced by an independent politician, Pierre Daccache, in a by-election.

References

External links
 Watch an Interview of Edmond Naim

Governors of Banque du Liban
Lebanese Forces politicians
Academic staff of Lebanese University
Lebanese lawyers
1918 births
2006 deaths
Lebanese Maronites
Progressive Socialist Party politicians
Lebanese bankers